Muhammad Farid bin Nezal (born 16 November 1997) is a Malaysian professional footballer who plays as a centre-back for Malaysia Super League club Negeri Sembilan.

Club Career
He was officially announced as a new Negeri Sembilan FC player on January 17, 2023.

References

External links
 

1997 births
Living people
Malaysian footballers
Malaysia Super League players
PKNP FC players
UiTM FC players
Perak F.C. players
Negeri Sembilan FC players
Association football defenders
People from Negeri Sembilan